The 2008 AFC U-16 Championship was the 13th competition of the AFC U-17 Championship organized by the Asian Football Confederation (AFC), which was held between 4 and 19 October 2008 in Tashkent, Uzbekistan. The Qualifiers was held in 2007 from 17–28 October.

Iran won their first title after beating South Korea 2–1 in the final.

Qualification competition

Stadiums

Squads

Group stage
All times local (UTC+5)

Group A

Group B

Group C

Group D

Knockout stages

Bracket

Quarterfinal

Semifinal

Final

Winners

Awards
The following awards were given at the conclusion of the tournament:

Goalscorers

Qualified teams for FIFA U-17 World Cup
The following four teams from AFC qualified for the 2009 FIFA U-17 World Cup.

1 Bold indicates champions for that year. Italic indicates hosts for that year.

Notes

References

External links
, the-AFC.com
AFC U-16 Championship 2008, stats.the-AFC.com

 
Under
International association football competitions hosted by Uzbekistan
2008 in Uzbekistani football
2008 in youth association football
AFC U-16 Championships